Felipe Antonio "Tony" Custer Hallett (born May 27, 1954, Lima, Peru) is a leading Peruvian businessman and philanthropist. He is the son and grandson, respectively, of Jacques R. Custer and Richard O. Custer, noted Swiss-Peruvian entrepreneurs. He was educated in Peru, the US and Europe, and currently heads the Corporación Custer as chairman and CEO, as well as The Fundación Custer, and is author of the best-seller The Art of Peruvian Cuisine, volumes I and II.

Custer is also chair of the Advisory Council of the David Rockefeller Center for Latin American Studies at Harvard, a director of the Orchestra of the Americas in Washington DC., president of Peru′s Heritage-oriented Patronato Cultural del Perú, and is involved in numerous other institutions.

Childhood and education
Custer attended at the Roosevelt School (American School) in Lima moving on to high school at the Hotchkiss School in Connecticut and the Institut Le Rosey in Switzerland.

Custer then received a bachelor's degree (cum laude) in economics from Harvard College (1976) and an MBA from Harvard Business School (1979).

Professional
The Custer Group of companies is in its 100 year in Peru, having expanded to ten countries: Peru, Ecuador, Colombia,Bolivia, Costa Rica, Guatemala, Nicaragua, Honduras, El Salvador, Dominican Republic and Panama.

The group currently has two main divisions: agrochemicals and specialty chemicals (Interoc) and a real estate arm. The company employs over 700 people in these ten countries.

Custer is also Chair Emeritus of the Advisory Board of the David Rockefeller Center for Latin American Studies

Philanthropy
Custer founded The Fundación Custer in 1996. To date, over 18,500 first and second grade students have attended the Aprendamos Juntos program, which equips at-risk children with basic learning skills, helping them progress through their schooling where they otherwise often repeat years and/or drop out. Aprendamos Juntos has also developed programs for parents and teachers. Through this program, over 13,255 parents have learned how to help their children overcome the challenges they face, and over 2600 teachers have acquired these skills. Finally, Aprendamos Juntos has developed a special pre-school program for those schools that have kindergarten.

Fundación Custer also assures the presence of the young Peruvian musicians selected every year to participate in the  Orchestra of the Americas programs.

As Chair of the Advisory Council, Custer contributed to the guidance of the David Rockefeller Center for Latin American Studies (DRCLAS), which is Harvard University's largest and most-active University-wide foreign studies center. Since its foundation, the Center has been instrumental in building bridges between Harvard and many of the key centers of learning in Latin America, as well as facilitating the travel to the region for thousands of Harvard University students and professors.

Custer heads the Patronato Cultural del Perú, as well as belonging to the Latin American Advisory Board of Harvard Business School, the Global Philanthropists′ Circle (Synergos, New York); the Group of 50 in Washington DC., Chair of the International Board of Centrum, Peru’s leading Business School; Perú 2021 in Peru, as well as numerous museums and other NGO boards in Peru and abroad.

In 2000, Tony Custer published The Art of Peruvian Cuisine, Peru's first world-class cookbook that has since sold over 100,000 copies, making it one of Peru’s bestselling cookbooks of all time. Influential in both its design and content, the book has helped place Peruvian cuisine in the limelight of world’s media. In addition, 100% of the book's proceeds help fund the Aprendamos Juntos  educational program.

A fond father of 5 and grandfather of 8, Custer has also written 4 original children’s books. The Osezno Febezno series follows the adventures of a « brave and well-mannered little bear cub » who shares important values through his experiences. As with the cookbook, all of the proceeds of the children’s books also go to Fundación Custer.

Finally, Custer is a songwriter and musician. He released a self-titled album in 2000, and plays in a rock’n’roll band that performs charity shows for the foundation.

He is married to one of Peru's top fashion designers, Ana Maria Guiulfo.

References

American chief executives
Living people
Harvard Business School alumni
Harvard College alumni
1954 births
Hotchkiss School alumni
Alumni of Institut Le Rosey
Peruvian philanthropists
People from Lima